The rivière à la Loutre (English: Otter River) is a tributary of the upper part of the Ottawa River. Rivière à la Loutre crosses the territory of the municipalities of Fugèreville and Saint-Bruno-de-Guigues, in the regional county municipality (MRC) of Témiscamingue, in Abitibi-Témiscamingue, in Quebec, in Canada.

Geography 

The neighboring watersheds of the Rivière à la Loutre are:
 north side: Témiscamingue Lake;
 east side: Laverlochère River, Cameron stream;
 south side: Lac Témiscamingue, Ottawa River, l'Africain stream;
 west side: lac Témiscamingue.

The main tributary of the Rivière à la Loutre is the Laverlochère River (coming from the east).

Lac d'Argent (formerly Lac d'Argent) constitutes the head lake of Rivière à la Loutre. ”It is located west of Lac Brisebois and west of the village of Ville-Marie.

Along its course, the Rivière à la Loutre collects several agricultural streams and passing just south of the village of Fugèreville. The river flows into Paulson Bay, on the east shore of Lake Témiscamingue, in the Ottawa River.

Toponymy 
The toponym Rivière à la Loutre was made official on December 5, 1968, at the Commission de toponymie du Québec.

See also 

 List of rivers of Quebec

References 

Rivers of Abitibi-Témiscamingue
Ottawa River